Asiaticus may refer to:

 Lucius Cornelius Scipio Asiaticus (2nd century BC), a Roman general and statesman
 Lucius Cornelius Scipio Asiaticus (consul 83 BC)
 Antiochus XIII Asiaticus (died 64 BC), a Seleucid ruler
 Decimus Valerius Asiaticus (died 47), an Imperial Roman consul
 Decimus Valerius Asiaticus (flourished 1st century), an Imperial Roman senator
 Decimus Valerius Taurus Catullus Messallinus Asiaticus (flourished 1st century & 2nd century), a Roman Priest and grandson of the above named

See also
List of Latin and Greek words commonly used in systematic names#Asiatica